Han Yeo-reum is a South Korean actress.

Filmography

Film 
 Sex Volunteer: Open Secret 1st Story (2010)
 Crazy Waiting (2008)
 Fantastic Parasuicides (2007)
The Bow (2005)
 Samaritan Girl (2004)

TV series 

A Thousand Affections | Aejung Manmanse (MBC / 2011-2012) - Chae Hee-Soo
City of Glass | Yuriui Seong (SBS / 2008-2009) - Kang Hye-Young
Sang Doo! Let's Go to School! | Sangduya, Hakgyogaja! (KBS2 / 2003)
Nonstop 2 (MBC / 2002)

TV shorts 

Drama Special "Do You Know Taekwondo?" (KBS2, 2012)

References

External links 

 Korean Movie Database KMDb page

South Korean television actresses
South Korean film actresses
1983 births
Living people
Place of birth missing (living people)